Sea holly is a common name for several plants and may refer to:
 Acanthus ebracteatus
 Eryngium species, especially:
 Eryngium maritimum